SS El Occidente was a cargo ship for the Morgan Line, a subsidiary of the Southern Pacific Company. During World War I, she was known as USAT El Occidente in service with the United States Army and as USS El Occidente (ID-3307) in service with the United States Navy. At the end of war, she reverted to her original name of SS El Occidente.

Built in 1910, SS El Occidente was one of four sister ships that carried cargo and a limited number of passengers for the Morgan Line. She was acquired by the U.S. Army after the United States entered World War I in April 1917, and converted to carry horses and mules to France. In February 1918, she fought a 20-minute gun battle with two German submarines, destroying the periscope of one. In August 1918, the ship was transferred to the U.S. Navy and continued transporting animals through the end of the war.

El Occidente returned to the Morgan Line in 1919 and sailed with them until June 1941, when the entire Morgan Line fleet was purchased by the United States Maritime Commission. While serving as a civilian-crewed cargo ship during World War II, El Occidente was torpedoed and sunk by German submarine U-435 on 13 April 1942.

Early career 
SS El Occidente was a cargo and passenger steamship launched on 24 September 1910 by the Newport News Shipbuilding and Dry Dock Co. of Newport News, Virginia (yard no. 133), and delivered to the Atlantic division of the Morgan Line on 2 December 1910. The vessel sailed for the Morgan Line, the brand name of the Southern Pacific Steamship Company (a subsidiary of the Southern Pacific Railroad), which employed her to carry cargo and a limited number of passengers between New York and New Orleans, the eastern terminus of the Southern Pacific line.

In April 1913, The New York Times reported that El Occidente, loaded only with cargo, had rammed a schooner in fog off the New Jersey coast. Responding to a wireless message, the Savannah steamer City of Montgomery came alongside El Occidente to offer assistance, but was refused. The name and fate of the schooner were not reported.

World War I 
After the United States declared war on Germany in April 1917, the United States Army, needing transports to get its men and materiel to France, had a select committee of shipping executives pore over registries of American shipping. The committee selected El Occidente and thirteen other American-flagged ships that were sufficiently fast, could carry enough fuel in their bunkers for transatlantic crossings, and, most importantly, were in port or not far at sea. After El Occidente discharged her last load of passengers and cargo, she was officially handed over to the Army on 30 May.

Before any troop transportation could be undertaken, all of the ships had to be hastily refitted. Of the fourteen ships, four, including El Occidente, were designated to carry animals and cargo; the other ten were designated to carry human passengers. The four ships designated to carry animals had to have ramps and stalls built. All the ships had to have gun platforms installed, before each ship docked at the Brooklyn Navy Yard to have the guns themselves installed. All the ships were manned by merchant officers and crews but carried two U.S. Navy officers, Navy gun crews, quartermasters, signalmen, and wireless operators. The senior Navy officer on board would take control if a ship came under attack.

El Occidente departed with her group on the morning of 17 June for Brest, France, steaming at an  pace. A thwarted submarine attack on the first convoy group, and reports of heavy submarine activity off of Brest resulted in a change in the convoy's destination to Saint-Nazaire.

El Occidente departed Saint-Nazaire on 14 July in the company of her convoy mates Dakotan, Montanan, and Edward Luckenbach. Joining the return trip were Army transport , Navy armed collier , Navy oiler , and cruiser , the flagship of Rear Admiral Albert Gleaves, the head of the Navy's Cruiser and Transport Force.

Sources do not reveal El Occidente's movements over the next eight months. But in April 1918, the Chicago Daily Tribune reported on an encounter El Occidente had with two German submarines that had occurred on 2 February. In a 20-minute running gun battle, Naval Armed Guardsmen aboard El Occidente exchanged fire with two U-boats, one on the port and one on the starboard. The news item reported that El Occidente's gunners had demolished the periscope of one of her attackers.

The convoy arrived in France on 30 May.

On 27 August 1918, El Occidente was transferred to the Navy and commissioned the same day with Lt. Commander E. S. Campbell, USNRF. El Occidente loaded cargo and 585 horses and mules, and sailed for France on 17 September. Five animals died or were destroyed during the voyage. Offloading her cargo at Saint-Nazaire and Verdun, El Occidente returned to the U.S. on 1 November.

In port when the Armistice with Germany was signed on 11 November, El Occidente loaded  of cargo and 800 animals for a second Navy voyage. Departing on 17 November for Verdun, the ship arrived there on 19 December. Returning to Baltimore for repairs and alterations which included the removal of her armament and the stalls for animal cargo, El Occidente sailed again on 15 January 1919 for Bordeaux where she unloaded cargo for the Army of Occupation and embarked 90 passengers for return to the United States. She was decommissioned at New York on 18 March 1919, and delivered to the United States Shipping Board the same day.

Interwar civilian service 
Returned by the USSB in March 1919, El Occidente resumed cargo service with the Morgan Line, where she had almost 15 years of routine operation. However, in the 1930s, sailing on a New York – Galveston route, El Occidente was involved in several notable events.

In July 1933, El Occidente had a fire in her No. 1 cargo hold while she was southbound  out from Norfolk, Virginia. El Occidente's initial radio message reported that her crew had the blaze under control, but when that proved not to be the case, she headed in, docked at the Norfolk grain elevator, and requested assistance from local firefighters.

In September 1935, El Occidente came to the aid of Morgan passenger liner , which had been driven onto French Reef by the Labor Day Hurricane. El Occidente, one of 15 ships that responded to Dixie's distress calls, carried two loads of passengers and baggage from Dixie to Miami. There was no loss of life during the grounding or the rescue of Dixie's passengers.

In January 1937, El Occidente issued a distress call while she was in the Gulf of Mexico. Before any reached the burning vessel, El Occidente reported that she had gotten the fire under control and needed no further assistance. El Occidente headed to Galveston. Coast Guard cutter  responded and towed El Occidente to Norfolk, delivering her there on 7 February.

World War II 
In June 1941, the United States Maritime Commission (USMC) announced that it had requisitioned the entire Morgan Line fleet of ten ships, including El Occidente and her remaining sister ships, El Oriente and El Mundo. The ships were to finish previously scheduled cargo runs and be handed over to the USMC over the following six weeks. The USMC had been charged with assembling a  U.S. fleet to "aid the democracies" fighting Germany in World War II, and paid $4.7 million for all ten ships and a further $2.6 million for repairs and refits.

El Occidente was handed over to the War Shipping Administration at Galveston on 7 July and assigned to United States Lines, Inc., for operation. The cargo ship was placed under Panamanian registry by U.S. Lines. Little is known of El Occidente's movements over the six months, but on 30 January 1942, she left Boston for Halifax loaded with a general cargo. Arriving at Halifax on 1 February, she joined Convoy HX 174 and headed for Liverpool on 7 February, arriving at her destination on 21 February.

Two days later, El Occidente sailed for Reykjavík, where she arrived on 1 March, just in time to depart with Convoy PQ 12 for Murmansk. After the convoy arrived at Murmansk on 12 March, El Occidente unloaded her cargo and took on a partial ballast load of chromium ore. She departed in Convoy QP 10 on 10 April. At 01:29 on 13 April, while at position , German submarine  under the command of Siegfried Strelow fired one or two torpedoes which struck El Occidente in the engine room, nearly breaking the vessel in half. El Occidente went down stern first within two minutes, with no time to launch lifeboats. Within 30 minutes of her sinking, one of the convoy's escorts, rescued 21 of the ship's 41-man crew; the remaining 20 crewmen died.

Notes

References

Bibliography

External links 
 

Ocean liners
World War I passenger ships of the United States
World War I auxiliary ships of the United States
Transport ships of the United States Army
World War II auxiliary ships of the United States
Ships sunk by German submarines in World War II
Shipwrecks in the Atlantic Ocean
1910 ships
Cargo ships of the United States Navy
Maritime incidents in April 1942
Ships built in Newport News, Virginia